Janti (Cool) is the fourth studio album by Turkish singer Murat Boz. It was released on 8 April 2016 by Doğan Music Company.

Release and content 
Janti was Boz's first studio album in 5 years. It contains 12 songs in total.

The composers who worked on the album were Sıla, Soner Sarıkabadayı, Oğuzhan Koç, Fettah Can, Alper Narman, Cansu Kurtçu, Onurr, Ersay Üner, Kadir Mutlu, and Leyla Özöksüz. Boz also wrote and composed two of the album's songs: "Elveda Deme" and "Siyah Gün". Ozan Çolakoğlu, Mustafa Ceceli, Emrah Karaduman and Gürsel Çelik served as the album's music arrangers. Ebru Gündeş was featured on the song "Gün Ağardı", the album's only duet. The album's photographs were taken by Emre Ünal, and İpek Ersoy served as Boz's stylist during the process.

Track listing

Sales

Release history

References 

2016 albums
Murat Boz albums
Turkish-language albums